Nitrilotriacetate monooxygenase is an enzyme with systematic name nitrilotriacetate,FMNH2:oxygen oxidoreductase (glyoxylate-forming). This enzyme catalyses the following chemical reaction

 nitrilotriacetate + FMNH2 + H+ + O2  iminodiacetate + glyoxylate + FMN + H2O

Nitrilotriacetate monooxygenase requires Mg2+.

References

External links 
 

EC 1.14.14